The Joint Working Group (JWG) was the first official bilateral administrative mechanism formed post the 1962 boundary war by India and China to discuss the boundary question with the aim of finding a solution. It was officially announced in a joint press communique in Beijing on 23 December 1988. A total of fifteen meetings of the JWG were held between 1989 and 2005. The last meeting was held on 30–31 March 2005. 

While the JWG was not able to resolve the boundary question, it was an important bilateral mechanism through which India and China gradually resolved certain aspects of the border problem. A "hotline" was set up between military commanders, border posts were opened, mechanisms for conveying troop positions were just some of the incremental changes accomplished.

Background 
The relevant part of the joint press communique reads:

The JWG would be led by the Indian foreign secretary and the Chinese deputy foreign minister. The JWG had a three-point mandate, summarized as, make recommendations and maintain border peace pending a final solution utilizing the expertise of military experts, communications experts, legal experts etc.

Rounds 

 30 June–4 July 1989
 30–31 August 1990
 12–14 May 1991
 20–21 February 1992
 27–29 October 1992
 24–27 June 1993
 6–7 July 1994
 18–20 August 1995
 16–18 October 1996
 4–5 August 1997
 26–27 April 1999
 28–29 April 2000
 31 July–1 August 2001
 21–22 November 2002
 30–31 March 2005

See also 

 India China border agreements
 1988: Joint press communique, 23 December
 Confidence building measures
 1993: Border Peace and Tranquility Agreement
 1996: Agreement on Military Confidence Building Measures
 2005: Protocol for the Implementation of Military Confidence Building Measures
 Political measures
 2003: Declaration on Principles for Relations and Comprehensive Cooperation
 2005: Agreement on the Political Parameters and Guiding Principles for the Settlement of the India-China Boundary Question
 2012: Agreement on the Establishment of a Working Mechanism for Consultation and Coordination on India-China Border Affairs
 2013: Border Defence Cooperation Agreement
 2020: 5 point statement

References 

Bibliography

 
 

China–India relations
China–India border